De-escalation is a human behavior that is intended to prevent the escalation of conflicts. It may also refer to approaches in conflict resolution. People may become committed to behaviors that tend to escalate conflict, so specific measures must be taken to avoid such escalation.

Overview

Verbal de-escalation in psychiatric settings 
In psychiatric settings, de-escalation is aimed at calmly communicating with an agitated client in order to understand, manage and resolve their concerns. Ultimately, these actions should help reduce the client's agitation and potential for future aggression or violence. An inadequate intervention, or one occurring too late, may leave staff needing to use coercive measures to manage an aggressive or violent client. Coercive measures, such as chemical or mechanical restraints, or seclusion, are damaging to the therapeutic relationship and harmful to clients and staff.

A review of the literature conducted by Mavandadi, Bieling and Madsen (2016) identified 19 articles that defined or provided a model of de-escalation.

Articles converge on a number of themes (i.e. de-escalation should involve safely, calmly and empathetically supporting the client with their concerns). Hankin et al.’s (2011) review of four de-escalation studies reflected the somewhat unclear state of de-escalation research. Their review settled on eight goals, seven elements, 15 general techniques and 15 other techniques divided into three subheadings. In addition, an attempt to synthesize the various models and definitions was conducted by Price & Baker (2012). Thematic analysis of 11 eligible studies converged on seven themes: three related to staff skills (e.g. empathetic concern, calm appearance and gentle tone of voice) and four related to the process of intervening (e.g. establish rapport, maintain safety, problem solve and set limits). The available literature provides clinical descriptions of effective de-escalation based on qualitative data and professional observations. However, these thematic analyses need to be supported by more objective data; one hallmark of such objectivity would be an empirical scale or quantitative measure of de-escalation.

De-Escalating Aggressive Behaviour Scale (DABS) 
An English modified version of the De-Escalating Aggressive Behaviour Scale (DABS) states
 Valuing the client: Provides genuine acknowledgement that the client's concerns are valid, important and will be addressed in a meaningful way.
 Reducing fear: Listens actively to the client and offers genuine empathy while suggesting that the client's situation has the potential for positive future change.
 Inquiring about client's queries and anxiety: Can communicate a thorough understanding of the client's concerns, and works to uncover the root of the issue.
 Providing guidance to the client: Suggests multiple ways to help the client with their current concerns and recommends preventive measures.
 Working out possible agreements: Takes responsibility for the client's care and concludes the encounter with an agreed-upon short-term solution and a long-term action plan.
 Remaining calm: Maintains a calm tone of voice and steady pace that is appropriate to the client's feelings and behaviour.
 Risky: Maintains a moderate distance from the client to ensure safety, but does not appear guarded and fearful.

Police and corrections

United States 

Starting around 2015, after facing criticism after numerous high-profile killings of civilians by police officers, some police forces in the US adopted de-escalation training, designed to reduce the risk of confrontations turning violent or deadly for anyone involved.

The FIRST STEP Act prison reform bill, passed under the Trump administration, mandates de-escalation training, especially for "incidents that involve the unique needs of individuals who have a mental illness or cognitive deficit."

Need for de-escalation practices in law enforcement 
Richards (2007) states that de-escalation is the act of moving from a state of high tension to a state of reduced tension. Bell (2018) points out that the reason there is heightened tension in law enforcement today than ever before is due to technology. Media reports on the use of force, racial unrest, riots and injustice make it seem like conflicts between police and citizens are happening every day. Bell notes that because people can so readily view these conflicts between police and citizens through technology, people have become resistant to or challenging of law enforcement. In response, the police have had to become engaged in social media, ethics training, diversity training and de-escalation programs.

Bell notes that police are different from average citizens. He states that citizens have a “duty to retreat" while trained officers are expected to pursue and make arrests if need be. Sometimes officers have some discretion in how they will handle a situation such as when an encounter has the potential to become violent. It is at these times that “officers can turn to de-escalation tactics and still complete their mission to protect and serve.” Oliva et al. note, “As the role of police officers continues to expand from exclusively crime fighting to encompass other service-oriented functions, they must be able to recognize the characteristics of individuals in crisis in order to provide an effective and helpful resolution to the situation while reducing liability and risk of injury” (p. 16.) Hence the need for de-escalation tactics on the part of law enforcement officers.

Types of de-escalation practices 
De-escalation tactics predominantly seem to involve securing the scene at hand and attempting to calmly communicate with the citizen involved. Andrew Bell describes several de-escalation practices to assist in a potentially violent situation:
 The Tactical Pause entails stepping back, pausing to allow everyone involved a brief moment to think, perhaps ending or limiting a fight-or-flight response.
 The Just-Be-Nice Tactic where the police officer speaks and gives commands in a friendly tone regardless of how the citizen is conducting themselves. Bell notes that there are occasions when the situation is not, in fact, what it appears to be and the citizen is not committing a crime or violation. The Just-Be-Nice Tactic is particularly helpful in such cases.
 Be Aware, Understand, then React. Police need to avoid getting caught up in the moment so should take a moment to be aware, assess and understand what is going on around them before they react.

Oliva et al. suggest the following basic de-escalation techniques: securing the scene, remove distractions or disruptive people from the area. Further, "The officer should remain calm and speak slowly, in short sentences, to encourage communication. The responding officer should also present a genuine willingness to understand and help". Oliva et al. go on to outline the following specific de-escalation techniques: 
 Effective Communication so that the officer and individual can understand each other.
 Active Listening Skills such as reflecting statements like "I understand that makes you angry". Use of minimal encouragers-brief responses, like saying 'OK,' that let the person know the officer is listening. Introducing oneself using "I" statements restating statements the individual says mirroring/reflecting or summarising/paraphrasing.
 Use of Open-Ended/Closed-Ended Questions.

Oliva et al. also note behaviors that officers should avoid when attempting to de-escalate a situation which include: Not asking “why” questions as it makes the person defensive, they shouldn’t rush the person, never speak too loudly, they should keep their feelings from interfering, they shouldn’t challenge a person if they are having delusions or hallucinations but neither should they agree they are real.

Memphis Model 
One of the most prominent de-escalation programs was developed by The Memphis Crisis Intervention Team or CIT. This program, which has come to be known as the Memphis Model, provides law enforcement with crisis intervention training to particularly help those with mental illness. This program is aimed at diverting those in a mental health crisis from ending up in jail. The goal of the program is to improve the safety of officers, family members and people in the community and to direct people with mental illness away from the judicial system and into the healthcare system. Through this program, officers are given 40 hours of comprehensive training that includes de-escalation techniques. Officers engage in role-playing various scenarios as part of this program.

According to The Memphis Crisis Intervention Team, research on the efficacy of CIT shows that it helps officers feel more confident, increases jail diversion for those with mental illness, increases the likelihood that those with mental illness get treatment, and injury to officers is significantly reduced. Compton et al. (2008) conducted a comprehensive review of the existing research on the effectiveness of the Memphis Model of the Crisis Intervention Team. While research is limited, the authors note that there is preliminary support that the Memphis Model may be helpful in connecting those with mental illness to the psychiatric services that they need. The authors further note that police officers knowledge and confidence improve with such training. Arrest rates also appear to be lower by officers trained in the CIT model. 

According to PBS, the Memphis Model has expanded to approximately 3,000 law enforcement agencies across the United States. However, there are shortcomings to the research done on the effectiveness of the CIT programs such as lack of control groups and small sample sizes. The CIT programs around the country seem limited to addressing instituting de-escalation interventions with the mentally ill and not with the broader range of offenders that law enforcement officers may encounter. Furthermore, not all officers are trained in CIT; only self-selected police officers participate in this specialized training.

Apex Officer 
There are other training programs, most notably the Apex Officer's Virtual Reality Training that addresses other de-escalation situations and is not limited just to work with the mentally ill. This training follows many of the basic de-escalation approaches noted above (e.g. effective communication, assessment of the scene) but is done through a virtual reality simulator. This model was introduced to the International Association of Chiefs of Police (IACP) at their 126th Annual Conference and Exposition in Chicago, Illinois in October 2019

Military tactics 
In the military, de-escalation is a way to prevent military conflict escalation. A historic example is the teaching harvested from the Proud Prophet war simulation of a conflict between the USA and the USSR, which took place in 1983.

In war-time diplomacy, de-escalation is used as an exit strategy, sometimes called an "off-ramp" or "slip road". In such cases, an alternative peaceful resolution is offered to a belligerent (i.e. nation or person engaged in war or conflict) in order to avoid further bloodshed.

In social settings 

This often involves techniques such as taking a time-out, and deflecting the conversation to individuals in the group who are less passionately involved. This is commonly used by a Fee Team in mental health nursing practice.

Research 

Research is needed to determine the effectiveness of de-escalation techniques with various populations and in varied settings. A 2018 Cochrane review on de-escalation techniques for managing non-psychosis induced aggression in adults found that uncertainty remains around effectiveness and efficacy.

See also 
 Ceasefire
 Conflict avoidance
 Cost of conflict
 Demilitarisation
 Mediation

References 

Conflict (process)
Diplomacy

Geopolitical rivalry
Law enforcement techniques
National security